(..)ibra was a king of Meluhha according to an inscription attributed to the reign of Naram-Sin of Akkad (2254–2218 BC), the third successor and grandson of Sargon of Akkad (2334–2279 BC).

Inscription
Naram-Sin (2254–2218 BC) listing the rebel kings to his rule, mentioned "(..)ibra, man of Melukha".

See also 
 Meluhha
 Sargon of Akkad
 Naram-Sin of Akkad

References 

3rd-millennium BC births
3rd-millennium BC deaths
23rd-century BC rulers
People associated with the Indus Valley civilisation